Sofular Cave is a show cave located in Sofular village of Zonguldak Province, northern Turkey.

References

Show caves in Turkey
Caves of Zonguldak Province
Tourist attractions in Zonguldak Province